Iodopepla u-album, the white-eyed borer moth, is a species of cutworm or dart moth in the family Noctuidae.

The MONA or Hodges number for Iodopepla u-album is 9522.

References

Further reading

 
 
 

Noctuinae
Articles created by Qbugbot
Moths described in 1852